Bayo Olayinka Ojikutu (born 1971) is a Nigerian-American creative writer, novelist and university lecturer.

His first novel, 47th Street Black (Crown, 2003), received the Washington Prize for Fiction and the Great American Book Award. Ojikutu's short fiction has appeared widely, including within the pages of the 2013 Akashic Press collection USA Noir and in the speculative fiction anthology Shadow Show. Ojikutu's short story, "Yayi and Those Who Walk on Water: A Fable", received a Special Mention nomination from the Pushcart Prize for outstanding fiction published in literary presses in 2009. By then, Three Rivers Press had released his second novel, Free Burning, to considerable critical acclaim .

Ojikutu has taught creative writing at the University of Chicago, DePaul, and at Roosevelt University.

References

External links
Ojikutu from Creative Quarantine Series in Esthetic Lens Magazine {July, 2020} 
Interview with Ojikutu from Newcity, a Chicago culture magazine 
Ojikutu in the TriQuarterly Literary Journal
Feature on Ojikutu from TNB.com
Ojikutu in Chicago Magazine .

Nigerian writers
21st-century American novelists
American male novelists
American people of Nigerian descent
1971 births
Living people
American people of Yoruba descent
University of Illinois Urbana-Champaign alumni

Writers from Chicago
21st-century American male writers
Novelists from Illinois